Sri Padmavati Mahila Visvavidyalayam (Sri Padmavati University) is a women's university in Tirupati, Andhra Pradesh, India. It was established as a state university by the Andhra Pradesh legislature in 1983 to provide Higher Education in general & professional areas for women. It is named after the goddess Sri Padmavati, the consort of Lord Venkateswara. The university has approximately 3,000 students. It admits students from all  regions of Andhra Pradesh.

Funds for development are received from the UGC and State Government. The university is accredited with 'A+' grade by the National Assessment and Accreditation Council. Prof. K. Raja Reddy was appointed as the Vice-Chancellor(In-Charge) in January, 2023.

Academics
Sri Padmavati Mahila Visvavidyalayam is a unitary university with 16 departments having 52 programme options: five postgraduate diploma, four undergraduate, 16 postgraduate, 14 M.Phil., and 14 Ph.D. programmes. Remedial teaching for the academically weaker students and the organisation of pre-examination coaching to backward community students are undertaken.

New features are courses that have a great demand in the job market such as MBA in Media Management, Integrated (five-year) course in Bio Technology, Bachelor of Physical Education and BioInformatics. The university also offers courses in Distance Education mode.

Campus 

The campus of Sri Padmavati Mahila Visvavidyalayam covers 138 acres (56 hectares) in a semi-urban area at the foot of the sacred Tirumala Hills.

Linkages

The university has linkages with foreign universities and national organisations. Some notable linkages are: 
  Staff development programme with the Department of Education, Loughborough University, UK, with financial assistance from the Andhra Pradesh State Council of Higher Education and the British Council through the overseas Development Administrative Programme.
  Women Entrepreneurship Development with the Department of Business Management and Entrepreneurship, Université de Montréal, Canada.
  An exchange programme with the Chinese Government for the promotion of research in Sericulture.

References

Report (2002?) by National Assessment and Accreditation Council, India

External links
 Official website

Women's universities and colleges in Andhra Pradesh
Universities and colleges in Tirupati
Educational institutions established in 1983
1983 establishments in Andhra Pradesh